Universal Time (UT or UT1) is a time standard based on Earth's rotation. While originally it was mean solar time at 0° longitude, precise measurements of the Sun are difficult. Therefore, UT1 is computed from a measure of the Earth's angle with respect to the International Celestial Reference Frame (ICRF), called the Earth Rotation Angle (ERA, which serves as a modern replacement for Greenwich Mean Sidereal Time). UT1 is the same everywhere on Earth. UT1 is required to follow the relationship
ERA = 2π(0.7790572732640 + 1.00273781191135448 · Tu) radians
where Tu = (Julian UT1 date - 2451545.0).

History
Prior to the introduction of standard time, each municipality throughout the clock-using world set its official clock, if it had one, according to the local position of the Sun (see solar time). This served adequately until the introduction of rail travel in Britain, which made it possible to travel fast enough over long distances to require continuous re-setting of timepieces as a train progressed in its daily run through several towns. Starting in 1847, Britain established Greenwich Mean Time, the mean solar time on the Prime Meridian at Greenwich, England, to solve this problem: all clocks in Britain were set to this time regardless of local solar noon. Using telescopes, GMT was calibrated to the mean solar time at the Royal Observatory, Greenwich in the UK. Chronometers or telegraphy were used to synchronize these clocks.

As international commerce increased, the need for an international standard of time measurement emerged. Several authors proposed a "universal" or "cosmic" time (see ). The development of Universal Time began at the International Meridian Conference. At the end of this conference, on 22 October 1884, the recommended base reference for world time, the "universal day", was announced to be the local mean solar time at the Royal Observatory in Greenwich, counted from 0 hours at Greenwich mean midnight. This agreed with the civil Greenwich Mean Time used on the island of Great Britain since 1847. In contrast, astronomical GMT began at mean noon, i.e. astronomical day X began at noon of civil day X. The purpose of this was to keep one night's observations under one date. The civil system was adopted as of 0 hours (civil) 1 January 1925. Nautical GMT began 24 hours before astronomical GMT, at least until 1805 in the Royal Navy, but persisted much later elsewhere because it was mentioned at the 1884 conference. Greenwich was chosen because by 1884 two-thirds of all nautical charts and maps already used it as their prime meridian.

During the period between 1848 and 1972, all of the major countries adopted time zones based on the Greenwich meridian.

In 1928, the term Universal Time (UT) was introduced by the International Astronomical Union to refer to GMT, with the day starting at midnight. The term was recommended as a more precise term than Greenwich Mean Time, because GMT could refer to either an astronomical day starting at noon or a civil day starting at midnight. As the general public had always begun the day at midnight, the timescale continued to be presented to them as Greenwich Mean Time.

When introduced, broadcast time signals were based on UT, and hence on the rotation of the Earth. In 1955 the BIH adopted a proposal by William Markowitz, effective January 1, 1956, dividing UT into UT0 (UT as formerly computed), UT1 (UT0 corrected for polar motion) and UT2 (UT0 corrected for polar motion and seasonal variation). UT1 was the version sufficient for "many astronomical and geodetic applications", while UT2 was to be broadcast over radio to the public. 

UT0 and UT2 soon became irrelevant due to the introduction of Coordinated Universal Time (UTC). Starting in 1956, WWV broadcast an atomic clock signal stepped by 20 ms increments to bring it into agreement with UT1. The up to 20 ms error from UT1 is on the same order of magnitude as the differences between UT0, UT1, and UT2. By 1960, the U.S. Naval Observatory, the Royal Greenwich Observatory, and the UK National Physical Laboratory had developed UTC, with a similar stepping approach. The 1960 URSI meeting recommended that all time services should follow the lead of the UK and US and broadcast coordinated time using a frequency offset from cesium aimed to match the predicted progression of UT2 with occasional steps as needed. Starting January 1, 1972, UTC was defined to follow UT1 within 0.9 seconds rather than UT2, marking the decline of UT2.

Modern civil time generally follows UTC. In some countries, the term Greenwich Mean Time persists in common usage to this day in reference to UT1, in civil timekeeping as well as in astronomical almanacs and other references. Whenever a level of accuracy better than one second is not required, UTC can be used as an approximation of UT1. The difference between UT1 and UTC is known as DUT1.

Adoption in various countries
The table shows the dates of adoption of time zones based on the Greenwich meridian, including half-hour zones.

Apart from Nepal Standard Time (UTC+05:45), the Chatham Standard Time Zone (UTC+12:45) used in New Zealand's Chatham Islands and the officially unsanctioned Central Western Time Zone (UTC+8:45) used in Eucla, Western Australia and surrounding areas, all time zones in use are defined by an offset from UTC that is a multiple of half an hour, and in most cases a multiple of an hour.

Measurement

Historically, Universal Time was computed from observing the position of the Sun in the sky. But astronomers found that it was more accurate to measure the rotation of the Earth by observing stars as they crossed the meridian each day. Nowadays, UT in relation to International Atomic Time (TAI) is determined by Very Long Baseline Interferometry (VLBI) observations of the positions of distant celestial objects (stars and quasars), a method which can determine UT1 to within 15 microseconds or better. Additional data sources include laser ranging of the Moon and artificial satellites, as well as the determination of GPS satellite orbits. 

The rotation of the Earth and UT are monitored by the International Earth Rotation and Reference Systems Service (IERS). The International Astronomical Union also is involved in setting standards, but the final arbiter of broadcast standards is the International Telecommunication Union or ITU.

The rotation of the Earth is somewhat irregular and also is very gradually slowing due to tidal acceleration. Furthermore, the length of the second was determined from observations of the Moon between 1750 and 1890. All of these factors cause the modern mean solar day, on the average, to be slightly longer than the nominal 86,400 SI seconds, the traditional number of seconds per day. As UT is thus slightly irregular in its rate, astronomers introduced Ephemeris Time, which has since been replaced by Terrestrial Time (TT). Because Universal Time is determined by the Earth's rotation, which drifts away from more precise atomic-frequency standards, an adjustment (called a leap second) to this atomic time is needed since 'broadcast time' remains broadly synchronised with solar time. Thus, the civil broadcast standard for time and frequency usually follows International Atomic Time closely, but occasionally step (or "leap") in order to prevent them from drifting too far from mean solar time. 

Barycentric Dynamical Time (TDB), a form of atomic time, is now used in the construction of the ephemerides of the planets and other solar system objects, for two main reasons. First, these ephemerides are tied to optical and radar observations of planetary motion, and the TDB time scale is fitted so that Newton's laws of motion, with corrections for general relativity, are followed. Next, the time scales based on Earth's rotation are not uniform and therefore, are not suitable for predicting the motion of bodies in our solar system.

Alternate versions

UT1 is the principal form of Universal Time. However, there are also several other infrequently-used time standards that are referred to as Universal Time, which agree within 0.03 seconds with UT1:

 UT0 is Universal Time determined at an observatory by observing the diurnal motion of stars or extragalactic radio sources, and also from ranging observations of the Moon and artificial Earth satellites. The location of the observatory is considered to have fixed coordinates in a terrestrial reference frame (such as the International Terrestrial Reference Frame) but the position of the rotational axis of the Earth wanders over the surface of the Earth; this is known as polar motion. UT0 does not contain any correction for polar motion while UT1 does include them. The difference between UT0 and UT1 is on the order of a few tens of milliseconds. The designation UT0 is no longer in common use.
 UT1R is a smoothed version of UT1, filtering out periodic variations due to tides. It includes 62 smoothing terms, with periods ranging from 5.6 days to 18.6 years. UT1R is still in use in the technical literature but rarely used elsewhere.
 UT2 is a smoothed version of UT1, filtering out periodic seasonal variations. It is mostly of historic interest and rarely used anymore. It is defined by

where t is the time as fraction of the Besselian year.

See also

 Airy mean time on Mars
 Earth orientation parameters
 List of international common standards
 Unix time

Notes

Citations

References

 

 Discusses the history of time standardization.

. Names have not been updated.

External links
Time Lord by Clark Blaise: a biography of Sanford Fleming and the idea of standard time

Time scales
Time in astronomy